NHS Research Scotland (NRS, formerly Health Science Scotland and Scottish Academic Health Science Collaboration), is a government agency that supports clinical and translational research in Scotland. NRS is a partnership between 4 of Scotland's medical schools (Edinburgh, Glasgow, Dundee and Aberdeen), the Scottish NHS Boards and the Chief Scientist Office. NRS brings together the most senior figures from across Government, academia and the NHS.

References

External links 
 

Academic health science centres
Higher education in Scotland
Innovation in the United Kingdom
Organisations supported by the Scottish Government
NHS Scotland
Scottish medical research
Translational medicine
2009 establishments in Scotland
Government agencies established in 2009
Research organisations in Scotland
Clinical research